Guangnan East Circuit or Guangnan East Province was one of the major circuits during the Song dynasty. Its administrative area corresponds to roughly the modern Chinese province of Guangdong (minus Leizhou Peninsula).

Guangnan East Circuit and Guangnan West Circuit were split from Guangnan Circuit in 988.

See also 
 Lingnan culture

References

 
 

 
Circuits of the Song dynasty
988 establishments
10th-century establishments in China
1278 disestablishments in Asia
13th-century disestablishments in China